Amphipappus is a North American genus in the family Asteraceae. It is native to desert regions of the southwestern United States, in southern California, southern Nevada, Arizona, and southeastern Utah.

There is only one known species Amphipappus fremontii. The flower heads are yellow and have both ray florets and disc florets. Its rounded clumps are scattered about dry, rocky areas.

The species takes its scientific epithet, fremontii from John C. Frémont, and is known commonly by the names chaffbush or eytelia (in honor of artist Carl Eytel).

References

External links
 berkeley.edu – Jepson Manual Treatment
 United States Department of Agriculture Plants Profile
 Calphotos Photo gallery, University of California
 

Astereae
Flora of the California desert regions
Flora of Arizona
Flora of Nevada
Flora of Utah
Natural history of the Mojave Desert
North American desert flora
Taxa named by Asa Gray
Taxa named by John Torrey
Monotypic Asteraceae genera
Flora without expected TNC conservation status